{{Speciesbox
| image = 
| status = LC
| status_system = IUCN3.1
| status_ref = <ref name="iucn status 11 November 2021">{{cite iucn |authors=Colli, G.R., Fenker, J., Tedeschi, L., Bataus, Y.S.L., Uhlig, V.M., Lima, A., Nogueira, C. de C., Borges-Nojosa, D.M., Costa, G.C., de Moura, G.J.B., Winck, G., Silva, J.R.S., Viñas, L.V., Ribeiro Júnior, M.A., Hoogmoed, M.S., Tinôco, M.S.T., Almeida-Santos, P., Valadão, R., de Oliveira, R.B., Avila-Pires, T.C.S., Ferreira, V.L. & de Menezes, V.A. |date=2021 |title='Tropidurus helenae |volume=2021|page=e.T49845566A159255198 |url= https://www.iucnredlist.org/species/49845566/159255198|access-date=16 December 2021}}</ref> 
| genus = Tropidurus
| species = helenae
| authority = (Manzani & Abe, 1990)
}}Tropidurus helenae'' is a species of lizard of the Tropiduridae family. It is found in Brazil.

References

Tropidurus
Reptiles described in 1990
Endemic fauna of Brazil
Reptiles of Brazil